Ansupa Lake is a  horseshoe-shaped fresh water oxbow lake on the left bank of the Mahanadi river, opposite Banki in Cuttack district, Odisha, India. It is a fresh water lake situated amidst the Saranda Hills and enclosed by bamboo tree greenery and mango trees and acts as a shelter for the migratory birds in the wintry weather season. There are boating and fishing facilities. The lake has been designated as a protected Ramsar site since 2021.

References

External links

 Integrated sustainable environmental conservation of Anshupa lake: A famous water resource of India
 Anshupa lake: A famous water resource of Odisha

Lakes of Odisha
Tourist attractions in Cuttack district
Ramsar sites in India